The metatarsal bones, or metatarsus, are a group of five long bones in the foot, located between the tarsal bones of the hind- and mid-foot and the phalanges of the toes. Lacking individual names, the metatarsal bones are numbered from the medial side (the side of the great toe): the first, second, third, fourth, and fifth metatarsal (often depicted with Roman numerals). The metatarsals are analogous to the metacarpal bones of the hand. The lengths of the metatarsal bones in humans are, in descending order, second, third, fourth, fifth, and first.

Structure 
The five metatarsals are dorsal convex long bones consisting of a shaft or body, a base (proximally), and a head (distally). The body is prismoid in form, tapers gradually from the tarsal to the phalangeal extremity, and is curved longitudinally, so as to be concave below, slightly convex above. The base or posterior extremity is wedge-shaped, articulating proximally with the tarsal bones, and by its sides with the contiguous metatarsal bones: its dorsal and plantar surfaces are rough for the attachment of ligaments. The head or distal extremity presents a convex articular surface, oblong from above downward, and extending farther backward below than above. Its sides are flattened, and on each is a depression, surmounted by a tubercle, for ligamentous attachment. Its plantar surface is grooved antero-posteriorly for the passage of the flexor tendons, and marked on either side by an articular eminence continuous with the terminal articular surface.

During growth, the growth plates are located distally on the metatarsals, except on the first metatarsal where it is located proximally. Yet it is quite common to have an accessory growth plate on the distal first metatarsal.

Articulations 

The base of each metatarsal bone articulates with one or more of the tarsal bones at the tarsometatarsal joints, and the head with one of the first row of phalanges at the metatarsophalangeal joints.  Their bases also articulate with each other at the intermetatarsal joints

 The first metatarsal articulates with the medial cuneiform, and to a small extent to the intermediate cuneiform.
 the second with all three cuneiforms.
 the third with the lateral cuneiform.
 the fourth with the lateral cuneiform and the cuboid.
 The fifth with the cuboid.

Muscle attachments

Clinical significance

Injuries

The metatarsal bones are often broken by association football players. These and other recent cases have been attributed to the lightweight design of modern football boots, which provide less protection to the foot. In 2010 some soccer players began testing a new sock that incorporated a rubber silicone pad over the foot to provide protection to the top of the foot. Stress fractures are thought to account for 16% of injuries related to sports participation, and the metatarsals are the bones most often involved. These fractures are sometimes called march fractures, based on their traditional association with military recruits after long marches. The second and third metatarsals are fixed while walking, thus these metatarsals are common sites of injury. The fifth metatarsal may be fractured if the foot is oversupinated during locomotion.

Protection from injuries can be given by the use of safety footwear which can use built-in or removable metatarsal guards.

Additional images

See also 
 Arches of the foot
 Ball (foot)
 Bone terminology
 Terms for anatomical location
 Jones fracture
 Lisfranc injury

Notes

References

External links

 

 
Bones of the lower limb
Bones of the foot